The Electro-Industrial Tribute to Rob Zombie is a tribute album completely dedicated to heavy metal musician Rob Zombie. It contains the original song "Dealt With" inspired by Rob Zombie's music.

Track listing
 "Meet the Creeper" - 2:55 (Private Benjamin)
 "Superbeast" - 3:56 (Transient)
 "House of 1000 Corpses" - 4:15 (Skoink)
 "How to Make a Monster" - 3:21 (Sinus Giddy)
 "Dragula" - 4:55 (Mitchell Sigman) 
 "More Human than Human" - 3:43 (Transient)
 "Living Dead Girl" - 3:29 (Sinus Giddy)
 "Demonoid Phenomenon" - 4:04 (Motor Industries)
 "Iron Head" - 3:25 (Skoink) 
 "Dealt With (Original Composition)" - 4:00 (Enemy of Evil)

References

Tribute albums
2002 compilation albums
Vitamin Records compilation albums
Rob Zombie